Bothel and Threapland is a civil parish in the Borough of Allerdale in Cumbria, England.  It contains nine listed buildings that are recorded in the National Heritage List for England.  All the listed buildings are designated at Grade II, the lowest of the three grades, which is applied to "buildings of national importance and special interest".  The parish contains the villages of Bothel and Threapland, and is otherwise rural.  Apart from a milestone, all the listed buildings are houses, farmhouses, or farm buildings.


Buildings

References

Citations

Sources

Lists of listed buildings in Cumbria